Etty Lau Farrell (born Etty Lau; December 10, 1974) is an Asian American vocalist, dancer and actress. She began working in the entertainment industry in Los Angeles, appearing in numerous music videos as well as nationally televised award shows. Etty was part of the original Pussycat Dolls, when the group, as a dance troupe, had a monthly residency at the Viper Room. In 1997, she toured with Jane’s Addiction on their "It’s my party tour", later dubbed the "Relapse Tour" where she met her future husband Perry Farrell. Etty's first major venture as a musician came in 2005 when she and Perry Farrell formed Satellite Party. Their debut album went in at #24 on the Billboard album chart. In 2008, Etty's vocals featured on the Twilight soundtrack. In 2010, she was one of the stars of Married to Rock, a TV series on the E! Network.

In 2018, Etty formed the Performance entity named Kind Heaven Orchestra, releasing a full album on BMG Records. In 2022, Etty began releasing her own solo music. Her debut single "He's a Rebel" was produced by husband Perry Farrell and featured well known artists, Taylor Hawkins, David Bryan and Elliot Easton.

Early life and career
Etty was born in Kowloon, Hong Kong, to a Cantonese father and a Shanghainese Mother. Her parents had a manufacturing and exporting company, supplying to brands such as Pepe Jeans and Unionbay. She attended St. Mary Canonian School in Tsim Sha Tsui, where she was raised. At the age of 10, her family moved to Bellevue, Washington. She attended Bellevue High School, where she founded a dance team. She trained as a classical ballerina at the Royal Academy of Dance in Hong Kong, then Pacific Northwest Ballet, and Cornish College of the Arts in Seattle. At the age of 18, after winning a year-long scholarship to the Edge Performing Art Center in Hollywood, she relocated to Los Angeles to pursue a professional dance career.

After completing the year-long professional scholarship at EDGE PAC, Etty began working in Los Angeles, in the entertainment industry as a dancer. She appeared in music videos, commercials, and movies, working with artists such as Bon Jovi, Jewel, Smash Mouth, Wyclef Jean, Ricky Martin, as well as televised award shows, dancing with Madonna at the Grammys and Eric Benet at the Soul Train Awards. In 1999, Etty joined Mötley Crüe as a dancer on their North American leg "Greatest Hits" tour.
 
Etty played Ginger, the love interest of the Red Power Ranger in the episode titled "A Red Romance". She also appeared in Hollywood Salome/Johnny 316, an experimental short film starring Vincent Gallo.

Career

Jane's Addiction
In 1997, Etty was booked as a dancer on the Jane’s Addiction "Relapse Tour", which started a performance relationship that would span a couple of decades. With the exception of the Jane’s Addiction and Nine Inch Nails tour, dubbed the "NINJA tour", Etty has performed at every Jane’s Addiction show since 1997, including the Jubilee tour in 2001, the 'Strays' tour leading into the 2003 Lollapalooza tour. "The Great Escape Artist" tour in 2011, "Detour" in 2015, and the "Sterling Spoon Anniversary Tour" in 2016.

Lollapalooza
In 2005, Perry Farrell and the William Morris Agency partnered with Austin, Texas-based company Capital Sports Entertainment (now C3 Presents) and retooled the event into its current format as an annual festival in Chicago. In 2014, Live Nation Entertainment bought a controlling interest in C3 Presents. Etty became co-chair on the board of directors, alongside Perry and six other partners from Lollapalooza, C3 Presents and LiveNation.

Satellite Party and other music
Just over a year after the Jane's Addiction disbanded, Satellite Party played its first gig at the Key Club in Los Angeles in 2005. Etty performed backing vocals, while husband Perry was lead singer, Tony Kanal on bass, Nuno Bettencourt on guitar, Steve Ferlazzo on keyboard and Kevin Figueiredo on drums. A second performance quickly followed at Lollapalooza in 2005 at Grant Park, Chicago on July 24, 2005.

The debut album Ultra Payloaded was released on May 29, 2007. Satellite Party's only album featured many well-known musicians, including Flea and John Frusciante of the Red Hot Chili Peppers, Fergie of The Black Eyed Peas, and New Order bassist Peter Hook. The album also featured unheard vocals from the late Jim Morrison of The Doors on the track "Woman in the Window." The album received positive reviews and debuted in the Billboard album chart at number 24. Etty's vocals featured on the tracks "Awesome," "Celebrate," "Ultra Payloaded Satellite Party" and "Mr. Sunshine."

A couple of months after the release of its first album, guitarist Nuno Bettencourt decided to leave the band, with Kevin Figueiredo also leaving shortly afterward to reform Extreme, who themselves had a hiatus since 1996. Satellite Party themselves decided to have a hiatus when Jane's Addiction spoke about reforming in 2008.

Etty's solo career began in the mid-2000s, originally when she started performing with Satellite Party. In 2008, "Go All the Way (Into the Twilight)" featured Etty's vocals and was a track on the blockbuster film, Twilight. She stood in for Macy Gray in the late 2000s and performed with The Doors after Gray didn't arrive at the venue due to her flight being diverted due to bad weather. In May 2016, Etty performed with husband Perry at a tribute for Fleetwood Mac at the Fonda Theater in Hollywood.

Kind Heaven Orchestra & solo career
In 2018, it was announced that a new orchestra would be forming, made up of rock legends from various bands. Matt Chamberlain of Pearl Jam with Chris Cheney and keyboardist Matt Rohde from Jane's Addiction also part of the lineup. Kind Heaven Orchestra debuted at the first ever Bill Graham Festival of Lights.

In 2019, husband Perry Farrell released new solo music and an album soon followed, titled Kind Heaven. Many of the tracks on the album featured Etty's vocals. The album reached 2nd position on Billboard's Heatseeker album chart.

In January 2022, it was announced that Farrell would be releasing new music as a solo artist. Her debut single was a cover of The Crystals 1962 track, He's a Rebel. The track was produced by husband Perry Farrell and also featured Taylor Hawkins from Foo Fighters, David Bryan from Bon Jovi and Elliot Easton from The Cars. She performed the track live at Lollapalooza in Chicago.

On May 22, 2022, Jane's Addiction had to pull out of performing at Welcome to Rockville after Dave Navarro was still unwell with Covid-19. Perry Farrell announced that Porno for Pyros would be reuniting for the first time in 26 years, with Etty on back-up vocals.

Heaven After Dark
In 2022, Etty launched ‘Heaven After Dark’ a new nightlife concert series created in partnership with her husband, Perry Farrell. Heaven After Dark focuses on iconic and up and coming musicians, performance artists and varietal acts to showcase alternative music, underground culture, and festival experiences into one event. The show's debut was in February 2022 in Los Angeles at the 1926 room at the Belasco Theater and featured The Kind Heaven Orchestra supported by The Paranoyds and NIIS and local electronic artist Nedarb.

In June 2022, Heaven After Dark announced their next show, Etty alongside her husband Perry Farrell reformed the original lineup of Porno for Pyros (Martyn LeNobel - Bass, Peter DiStefano - Guitar, Stephen Perkins - Drummer) for the first time in 26 years, the performance included a special appearance from Guns N' Roses guitarist Gilby Clarke, who performed the Jane’s Addiction songs 1% and Bad Shit. The event also featured performances from Frankie and the Witch Fingers, Starcrawler and Electronic artists Mana and Lira.

Porno for Pyros
In 2022, Etty debuted as a back up singer while the band performed for the first time in 26 years at Welcome to Rockville in Daytona Beach. She subsequently performed with the band at Belasco theatre in downtown LA, then the Metro in Chicago, both shows were quickly sold out. In the Summer of 2022, Etty once again join the band on stage at the Flagship Lollapalooza in Chicago.

Personal life
Etty married Perry Farrell, lead singer of Jane's Addiction in June 2002. They have two sons together, Hezron and Izzadore Farrell.
 
Etty met husband and future bandmate Perry Farrell while she was a dancer on Jane's Addiction's Relapse tour in 1997. They started dating a couple of years later in 1999. The Jane's Addiction songs "Wrong Girl", "Superhero", "To Match the Sun", and the unreleased "Cling to You" were written for Etty.

References

External links
Etty Lau Farrell at alivenotdead.com
Etty Lau Farrell on Myspace

Hong Kong emigrants to the United States
American rock singers
Women rock singers
Singers from Washington (state)
Living people
1974 births
People from Bellevue, Washington
Cornish College of the Arts alumni
American musicians of Hong Kong descent
American dancers of Asian descent
American musicians of Chinese descent
Dancers from Washington (state)
20th-century Hong Kong women singers
Hong Kong dancers
20th-century American women singers
20th-century American singers
21st-century American women singers
21st-century American singers
Satellite Party members
Participants in American reality television series